Sud - Muntenia (South - Muntenia) is a development region in Romania. As other development regions, it does not have any administrative powers, its main function being to co-ordinate regional development projects and manage funds from the European Union. It is located entirely in the historic region of Muntenia, with its Development Agency HQ in Călărași.

Counties
The Sud region is made up of the following counties:
Argeș
Călărași
Dâmbovița
Giurgiu
Ialomița
Prahova
Teleorman

See also
Development regions of Romania
Nomenclature of Territorial Units for Statistics

References

Development regions of Romania